Hillsborough is a historic plantation house located near Walkerton, King and Queen County, Virginia. It was built in the mid-18th century, and is a two-story, five bay, brick and frame dwelling. It has a hipped roof and a frame two-story wing.  Also on the property is the contributing two-story brick storehouse.

It was listed on the National Register of Historic Places in 1971.

References

External links
Hillsborough, Walkerton, King and Queen County, VA: 13 photos, 22 measured drawings, and 6 data pages at Historic American Buildings Survey

Plantation houses in Virginia
Houses on the National Register of Historic Places in Virginia
Houses in King and Queen County, Virginia
National Register of Historic Places in King and Queen County, Virginia
Historic American Buildings Survey in Virginia